La Habana Airport  is an airport  northeast of San Pedro, a village in the Beni Department of Bolivia.

See also

Transport in Bolivia
List of airports in Bolivia

References

External links
OpenStreetMap - La Habana Airport
HERE/Nokia - La Habana

Airports in Beni Department